John Gordon Armstrong  (29 March 1935 – 5 December 2018) was a New Zealand politician of the National Party.

Member of Parliament

He represented the electorate of New Plymouth in Parliament from 1990 to 1993, when he was defeated by the previous Labour MP, Harry Duynhoven.

He was one of six one-term National MPs who were elected in a swing against Labour in the 1990 election.

Born on 29 March 1935 in Wanganui, Armstrong was educated at Wanganui Collegiate School.

In the 2006 Queen's Birthday Honours, Armstrong was appointed a Companion of the Queen's Service Order for community service. He died in New Plymouth on 5 December 2018.

References

 1990 Parliamentary Candidates for the New Zealand National Party by John Stringer (New Zealand National Party, 1990)

1935 births
2018 deaths
New Zealand National Party MPs
Companions of the Queen's Service Order
New Zealand justices of the peace
People educated at New Plymouth Boys' High School
People educated at Whanganui Collegiate School
New Zealand businesspeople
Unsuccessful candidates in the 1993 New Zealand general election
Members of the New Zealand House of Representatives
New Zealand MPs for North Island electorates